Boris Vladimirovich Chukhlov (born October 26, 1960 in Leningrad, now St. Petersburg) is a Russian professional football coach and a former player.

Honours
 Soviet Top League champion: 1984.

European club competitions
With FC Zenit Leningrad.

 UEFA Cup 1987–88: 2 games, 1 goal.
 UEFA Cup 1989–90: 4 games, 1 goal.

1960 births
Living people
Soviet footballers
Soviet Top League players
FC Zenit Saint Petersburg players
Soviet expatriate footballers
Expatriate footballers in Finland
Russian football managers
FC Metallurg Lipetsk managers
Ponnistus Helsinki players
Association football forwards
Soviet expatriate sportspeople in Finland